The 1987 Speedway World Pairs Championship was the eighteenth FIM Speedway World Pairs Championship. The final took place in Pardubice, Czechoslovakia. The championship was won by host Denmark (52 points) who beat England (44 points) and United States (36 points).

Semifinal 1
  Toruń
 June 6

Semifinal 2
  Norden
 June 6

World final
  Pardubice, Svítkov Stadion
 June 28

See also
 1987 Individual Speedway World Championship
 1987 Speedway World Team Cup
 motorcycle speedway
 1987 in sports

References

1987
World Pairs
World Pairs